Kent High School could refer to the following schools:

United States
Kent-Meridian High School in Kent, Washington, originally known as Kent High School
Theodore Roosevelt High School in Kent, Ohio, originally known as Kent High School
Kent City High School in Kent City, Michigan
Kent Island High School in Stevensville, Maryland
New Kent High School in New Kent, Virginia

Australia
Kent Street Senior High School in Kensington, Western Australia